Frederik Vilhelm Hvalsøe (23 May 1883, Holbæk - 3 March 1958, Copenhagen) was a Danish architect.

Biography
Hvalsøe was born at  Holbæk  on the island of Zealand, Denmark. He attended the Royal Danish Academy of Fine Arts from 1905 to 1916.
He was  most notable for his collaborations with Arthur Wittmaack with whom he started an architectural firm in 1916.  The firm principally designed buildings in and around Copenhagen, Denmark. Hvalsøe participated in the 1928 Summer Olympics in Amsterdam in the category of architecture. Together with Wittmaack, he exhibited  at the Brussels International Exposition (1935).

Gallery

References

20th-century Danish architects
1883 births
1958 deaths
People from Holbæk Municipality
Royal Danish Academy of Fine Arts alumni
Olympic competitors in art competitions